Kilcavan GAA is a Gaelic Athletic Association gaelic football club in County Laois, Ireland.

History
Founded in 1946, the club colours are maroon and white. The club grounds are situated near the villages of Killeigh and Geashill which are on the other side of the Offaly border.

Derek O'Connell in 1995 became the first and to date only Kilcavan player to play for Laois at senior championship level.

Kilcavan has won four Laois Junior Football Championship titles (1960, 1993, 2004 and 2013) as well as the Laois Junior "B" Football Championship title in 1984. The club also won the Laois All-County Football League Division 3 title in 2003 and 2016.

At underage level, Kilcavan field teams in the under 13, under 15 and under 17 grades in an amalgamation with The Rock.

Achievements
 Laois Junior Football Championships: (4) 1960, 1993, 2004, 2013
 Laois Junior B Football Championship: (1) 1984
 Laois All-County Football League Division 3: (2) 2003, 2016
 Laois All-County Football League Division 4: (1) 1988

Notable players

External links
 Kilcavan GAA Official Website
 Laoistalk - Laois GAA News Website

Gaelic games clubs in County Laois
Gaelic football clubs in County Laois